Cishousi is an interchange station on Line 6 and Line 10 of the Beijing Subway. This station opened on December 30, 2012.  It is named after the nearby Pagoda of Cishou Temple.

Station Layout 
Both the line 6 and 10 stations have underground island platforms.

Exits 
There are 5 exits, lettered B, C1, C2, D, and I. Exits C2 and D are accessible.

Gallery

References

External links
 

Railway stations in China opened in 2012
Beijing Subway stations in Haidian District